(高岡 智照 April 22, 1896 – October 22, 1994) was a geisha in  who became a Buddhist nun later in life. She became famous for her radiant beauty, and for chopping off one of her fingers for her lover. She was a popular model featured in postcards, and was known internationally as the "Nine-Fingered Geisha". She also inspired 's novel, .

Childhood in Osaka
 was born in 1896 in Nara Prefecture, but her birth notification was registered at  city hall by her parents. Her father was an alcoholic who worked as a blacksmith. When  was two years old, her mother, died; some theories speculate that  ran away from home.  was brought up lovingly by her grandmother, and when she was seven years old, she worked in her aunt's tea parlor as a waitress. Her unusual beauty helped her gain popularity, and her  was bought by a chairperson of an  stock exchange transaction.

When  discovered she had a picture of a kabuki actor in her hand mirror, he became jealous and broke up with her. It was also said that, when he was trying to cure his arthritis at the  spa, she came over and proposed love suicide to him, but he refused it. Then she gave her own finger for the purpose of appealing for his love.

Life in Tokyo
The day she debuted, she got word that her younger brother had been burned to death in a fire. 
Many men came and saw her and she soon became a sought-after geisha. The many picture cards of her were a commercial commodity, and they sold quickly. Some men also illegally copied and sold them, and  accused them of copyright infringement.

She had a modest talent as a geisha, having an academic goal. She learned the kanji by reading many books and later became a writer.

From geisha to Buddhist sister
She visited the United States with her husband and traveled across the entire county. During this time she lived in a girls' school dormitory while studying English for eight months. After returning home, her behavior in the U.S. created tensions in her marriage. She attempted suicide two times, and they divorced.

After this, she traveled back to the U.S. She went to London, and on her friend 's advice, she moved to Paris where, it is said, she gave birth to a child.

After returning home, she worked as a geisha.

In 1928, she wrote the first of five autobiographies, titled .

In 1963,  wrote the novel , which was inspired by 's life.

She died in 1994 at the age of 98.

References

External links 
A collection of postcards of Shoyo
Teruha (Meiji) Immortal Geisha

1896 births
1994 deaths
20th-century executions by Japan
20th-century Japanese women writers
20th-century Buddhist nuns
Buddhist writers
Geishas
Japanese amputees
Japanese Buddhist nuns
Japanese idols
People of Meiji-period Japan
People from Nara Prefecture
Writers from Osaka
Writers from Nara Prefecture